Anđelić, also written Andjelić, is a surname from the Balkans. It may refer to:

Alex Andjelic (1940–2021), Serbian ice hockey coach
Božo Anđelić (born 1992), Montenegrin handball player
German Anđelić (1822–1888), bishop of Bačka and Serbian Patriarch
Kića Anđelić, Serbian trumpeter, member of Deca Loših Muzičara
Miljan Anđelić, Serbian footballer
Nataša Anđelić (born 1977), Serbian basketball player
Pavao Anđelić (1920–1985), Yugoslav historian and archaeologist
Tatomir Anđelić (1903–1993), Serbian mathematician and expert in mechanics

See also
Anđelović

Serbian surnames
Matronymic surnames